Witness is a Canadian documentary television series which was broadcast from 1992 to 2004. Various independently produced documentaries were introduced by host Knowlton Nash.

Noted episodes of the series included Utshimassits: Place of the Boss, a documentary about the Davis Inlet crisis of the early 1990s which won the Donald Brittain Award in 1996.

References

External links
 CBC Witness (archived, 2004)

1990s Canadian documentary television series
2000s Canadian documentary television series
1992 Canadian television series debuts
2004 Canadian television series endings
CBC Television original programming